Lui Giuliani is an Australian businessman.

Business
After graduating with a Bachelor of Business from Curtin University, Giuliani spent 20 years at Ernst & Young including seven as a partner.

After leaving Ernst & Young Giuliani co-founded Primewest Capital Pty Ltd. He is currently managing director of Primewest.

Perth Glory
Giuliani was appointed to the Perth Glory FC advisory committee in May 2008 after the departure of John Spence from the club. In February 2009 after the departure of Brett McKeon Giuliani was appointed in an ambassadorial role as Deputy Chairman of the club. From early April 2009 he took on a short term role of acting chief executive officer until Paul Kelly was appointed.

References

Australian businesspeople
Perth Glory FC
Australian soccer chairmen and investors
People from Perth, Western Australia
Living people
Year of birth missing (living people)